The Philippine Amateur Soft Tennis Association is the national governing body for Soft Tennis in the Philippines. It  is accredited by the International Soft Tennis Federation which is the governing body for the sport of Soft Tennis in the world.

External links
Amateur Philippine Amateur Soft Tennis Association profile at the Philippine Olympic Committee website

Philippines
Soft tennis in Asia
Soft tennis